TSC22 domain family protein 3 is a protein that in humans is encoded by the TSC22D3 gene.

Function 

The protein encoded by this gene shares significant sequence identity with the murine TSC-22 and Drosophila shs, both of which are leucine zipper proteins, that function as transcriptional regulators. GILZ shows ubiquitous expression across tissues, including thymus, spleen, lung, fat, liver, kidney, heart, and skeletal muscle. The expression of this gene is stimulated by glucocorticoids and interleukin 10, and it appears to play a key role in the anti-inflammatory and immunosuppressive effects of this steroid and chemokine. Transcript variants encoding different isoforms have been identified for this gene.

Interactions 

TSC22D3 has been shown to interact with C-Raf, NFKB2 and NFKB1.

References

Further reading